Teruel Airport  is an airport near Teruel in the Teruel Province of Spain. Known under the commercial name Plataforma Aeroportuaria-Teruel (PLATA), it was certified for public use by the Spanish Aviation Safety and Security Agency (AESA) on 5 February 2013. Permission for air operations was granted by the AESA on 28 February 2013. The airport serves as an aircraft maintenance and aircraft storage facility for the  company.

PLATA is owned by a consortium formed by the Government of Aragon and Teruel City Council, and does not belong to Aena Group, the Spanish airports management company.

The dry climate makes the airport suitable for long-term aircraft storage, with capacity for 250 aircraft. During the COVID-19 pandemic, approximately 100 grounded planes were parked there.

The airport includes a main building with a control tower as well as a basic terminal, but is not equipped to handle passenger traffic. An aircraft rescue and firefighting (ARFF) station is located next to the terminal. Also on site are three main maintenance and part-removal hangars (the original one for Boeing 747s and the newest for Airbus A340s).

PLD Space Propulsion Test Facilities
In August 2018, Spanish launch service provider PLD Space signed a concession with the Teruel Airport Consortium for 13,337 m2 of space at the airport to test launch vehicle technology. The agreement covered 25 years, with an optional 10-year extension. PLD Space was to invest €1M in infrastructure for the construction of a new control room, offices, access paths, a rocket engine maintenance hangar and a new test bench to test its Miura 1 rocket. Over the previous three years, testing had been conducted on a short-term contract basis.

References

External links
 Official site
 Teruel Airport
 Tarmac Aerosave Company
 Report for spotters with pictures

Airports in Aragon
Teruel
Aircraft boneyards